European Classical music has long relied on music competitions to provide a public forum that identifies the strongest players and contributes to the establishment of their professional careers. This is a list of current competitions in classical music, with each competition and reference link given only once. Many offer competitions across a range of categories and in these cases they are listed under "General/mixed". Competitions with age restrictions are listed under "Young musicians".

Chamber music 
 Progressive Musicians Carnegie Hall Laureate Gala
 "Città di Barletta - International Young Musician Competition " International Young Musician Chamber Music Competition (Barletta/Apulia, Italy)
Bucharest International Music Competition | Wind Quintet & Brass Quintet
 International Chamber Music Competition Hamburg for piano trios and string quartets (Hamburg, Germany)
 International Chamber Music Ensemble Competition of New England (Boston, Massachusetts, US)
 International Contest–Festival of Chamber Ensemble Performance (Magnitogorsk, Russia)
 International Maria Yudina Competition of Young Pianists, Duo Pianists and Chamber Ensembles (St. Petersburg, Russia)
 International Radio Competition for Young Musicians Concertino Praga (Prague, Czech Republic)
 International Shostakovich Chamber Music Competition (Moscow, Russia)
 International String Quartet Competition Radom Chamber Orchestra (Radom, Poland)
 Melbourne International Chamber Music Competition (previously named the Asia-Pacific Chamber Music Competition) for piano trios and string quartets (Melbourne, Australia)
 Quebec Music Competition (Montreal, Quebec, Canada) Live and Online
 St Martin's Chamber Music Competition (London, UK)
 "Salieri – Zinetti" International Chamber Music Competition (Verona/ Mantova, Italy)
 Sydney Eisteddfod Musica Viva Chamber Music Award (Sydney, Australia)
 Terem Crossover International Music Competition instrumental ensembles (Saint-Petersburg, Russia)
 Trondheim International Chamber Music Competition (Trondheim, Norway)
 Triomphe de l'Art International Music Competition (Brussels, Belgium)
 Central European String Quartet International Composition Competition (Budapest, Hungary)

Choral/voice 

Australian Concerto and Vocal Competition (Townsville, Australia)
 Australian Singing Competition (Sydney, Australia)
 Barry Alexander International Vocal Competition (US)
 Bampton Classical Opera Young Singers' Competition (UK)
 BBC Singer of the World competition (Cardiff, Wales)
 Boris Christoff International Competition for Young Singers (Sofia, Bulgaria)
 Concours international de chant de Toulouse (Toulouse, France)
 Concours International Nei Stemmen (Luxemburg City, Luxemburg)
 Concurs Internacional de Cant Francesc Viñas (Barcelona, Spain)
 Concurs Internacional de cant Jaume Aragall (Barcelona, Spain)
 Elena Obraztsova International Competition for young opera singers (St. Petersburg, Russia)
 Elizabeth Connell Prize International Singing Competition for Sopranos
 International Early Music Vocal Competition "Canticum Gaudium", Poznan, Poland
 International Hans Gabor Belvedere Singing Competition (Vienna, Austria)
 International Hilde Zadek Voice Competition (Vienna, Austria)
 International Johann Sebastian Bach Competition (Leipzig, Germany)
 International Singing Competition Neue Stimmen (Gütersloh, Germany)
 International Stanisław Moniuszko Vocal Competition (Warsaw, Poland)
 International Stasys Šimkus choir competition (Klaipėda, Lithuania)
 International Tchaikovsky Competition (Moscow, Russia)
 International Vocal Competition 's-Hertogenbosch ('s-Hertogenbosch, Netherlands)
 International Voice Competition – Gerda Lissner Foundation (New York, US)
 International Zdeněk Fibich Competition in interpretation of melodrama
 The Featured NY. International Singing Competition (New York, US)
 Jan, Edward, Józefina Reszke Vocal Competition
 Joan Sutherland & Richard Bonynge Bel Canto Award
 The Klaudia Taev Competition for Young Opera Singers (Pärnu, Estonia).
 Lotte Lehman League Art Song Contest
 Marilyn Horne Song Competition, competition for classical singers and piano accompanists since 1997.
 Monte-Carlo Music Masters 
 Montserrat Caballe International Singing Competition (Zaragoza, Spain)
 National Anthem Bicentennial (Fort McHenry, US)
 Nuovo Canto Opera Competition in Milano
 Operalia, The World Opera Competition (Paris, France)
 Prague Christmas (Prague, Czech Republic)
 Quebec Music Competition (Montreal, Quebec, Canada) Live and Online
 Queen Elisabeth Music Competition (Brussels, Belgium)
 Queen Sonja International Music Competition (Oslo, Norway)
 Triomphe de l'Art International Music Competition (Brussels, Belgium)
 Vancouver International Music Competition (Vancouver, Canada)
 Youth Zeal Music Competition (Helsinki, Finland)

Composition

 Progressive Musicians Carnegie Hall Laureate Gala
 "Città di Barletta - International Young Musician Competition " International Young Musician Composition Competition (Barletta/Apulia, Italy)
 Alba Rosa Viëtor Composition Competition (Amsterdam, The Netherlands)
 Alexander Zemlinsky Prize for Composition (Cincinnati, US)
 ARBORETUM Krzysztof Penderecki International Composers' Competition (Radom, Poland)
 Bucharest International Music Competition | Composition for Wind Quintet & Brass Quintet
 Classic Pure Vienna International Composition Competition (Vienna, Austria)
 Competition for Young Composers dedicated to Maestro Gian Carlo Menotti (Spoleto, Italy)
 Cum Laude Music Awards. International Consonant Chamber Music Composition Contest
 Fifteen-Minutes-of-Fame (New York City, US)
 Gardner Composition Competition (American Viola Society, US)
 Gaudeamus International Composers Award (Netherlands)
 George Enescu International Competition (Composition section) (Bucharest, Romania)
 Henryk Mikołaj Górecki International Composers Competition (Cracow, Poland)
 International Antonín Dvořák Composition Competition (Prague, Czech Republic)
 International Composition Competition of Vienna Classical Music Academy (Vienna, Austria)
 International Composers Festival, Hastings and Bexhill, East Sussex, United Kingdom
 International Composition Prize (Sacile PN, Italy)
 International Uuno Klami Composition Competition (Kotka/Kouvola, Finland)
 Isla Verde Bronces International Brass Composition Contest (Córdoba, Argentina)
 Kazimierz Serocki International Composers' Competition (Warsaw, Poland)
 Lake George Music Festival Composition Competition (New York, US)
 Masterprize International Composing Competition
 Mauricio Kagel Composition Competition (Vienna, Austria)
 Midi & MP3 Composition Music Contest for Composers
 Northwest Indiana Symphony Composition Competition (Indiana, US)
 PARMA Student Composer Competition (North Hampton, US)
 Project Trio Composition Competition (Brooklyn, US)
Quebec Music Competition (Montreal, Quebec, Canada) Live and Online
 Queen Elisabeth Music Competition (Brussels, Belgium)
 60x60 – International (New York, US)
 RED NOTE New Music Festival Composition Competition (Illinois, US)
 Reveille Trumpet Collective Composition Prize
 Royal Northern Sinfonia Young Composers' Competition (Newcastle, UK)
 SAMADIS International Composition Competition (New York City, US)
 Tōru Takemitsu Composition Award (Tokyo, Japan)
 Zvi Zeitlin Memorial International Composer's Competition

Conducting

 Cadaqués Orchestra International Conducting Competition (Spain)
 Donatella Flick Conducting Competition (UK)
 Guido Cantelli Conducting Competition (Italy)
 Gustav Mahler Conducting Competition (Germany)
 International Besançon Competition for Young Conductors (France)
 International Conducting Competition Jeunesses Musicales Bucharest (Romania)
 Jorma Panula Conducting Competition (Finland)
 Leeds Conductors Competition (UK)
 Nicolai Malko Competition For Young Conductors (Denmark)
 Sir Georg Solti International Conductors' Competition (Germany)
 The Grzegorz Fitelberg International Competition for Conductors (Poland)
 Tokyo International Music Competition for Conducting (Japan)

General/ mixed 
 Progressive Musicians Carnegie Hall Laureate Gala
 "Città di Barletta - International Young Musician Competition " International Young Musician Chamber Music Competition (Barletta/Apulia, Italy)
American Virtuoso International Music Competition (Washington D.C., US) 
Appassionato International Youth Music Festival (Quebec, Canada) 
Brilliant Talent Discovery Awards International Music Competition
 Vancouver International Music Competition (Vancouver, Canada)
 The American Prize (Connecticut, US)
 American Protege Gala Concert at Stern Auditorium (New York, US)
 Balys Dvarionas International Competition for Young Pianists and Violinists (Lithuania)
 Classic Pure Vienna International Music Competition (Vienna, Austria)
 Cleveland Aradhana – South Indian Classical Music Competition (Cleveland, US)
 E-Gré National Music Competition (Brandon, Canada)
 EUROPAfest (Bucharest, Romania)
 France Music Competition (Landes le Gaulois, France)
 Franz Schubert and Modern Music International Music Competition, Graz
 International Music Competition of Vienna Classical Music Academy (Vienna, Austria)
 International Crescendo Music Awards Competition (Tulsa, US)
 King's Peak International Music Competition (California, US)
 Long-Thibaud-Crespin Competition (previously International Marguerite Long-Jacques Thibaud Competition; Paris, France)
 Nishinihon International Music Competition (Fukuoka, Japan)
 Mykola Lysenko International Music Competition (Kyiv, Ukraine)
 ON STAGE International Classical Music Competition (Online Competition)
 Quebec Music Competition (Montreal, Quebec, Canada) Live and Online
 Rising Stars Grand Prix – International Music Competition (Berlin, Germany)
 Naumburg Competition (New York, US)
 Washington International Competition (Washington, US)
 Windsor Festival International String Competition (Windsor, UK)
 Vienna New Year’s Concert International Music Competition (Vienna, Austria)
 The World Competition (entirely online; New York & Bologna)
Triomphe de l'Art International Music Competition (Brussels, Belgium)
MAP International Music Competition (USA)

Instrumental

 Progressive Musicians Carnegie Hall Laureate Gala
 “Vienna New Year’s Concert” International Music Competition
 " International Piano Competition - Mauro Paolo Monopoli Prize " International Piano Competition (Barletta/Apulia, Italy)
 "Città di Barletta - International Young Musician Competition " International Young Musician Competition (Barletta/Apulia, Italy)
Calabria International Piano Competition (Calabria, Italy)
 American Protege International Concerto Competition (New York, US) 
 Viseu International Guitar Competition (Viseu, Portugal)
 Vancouver International Music Competition (Vancouver, Canada)
 "Arrasate Hiria" International Accordion Competition (Arrasate, Spain)
 ARD International Music Competition (Munich, Germany)
 Australian Concerto and Vocal Competition (Townsville, Australia)
 Budapest International Guitar Competition (BIGC; Budapest, Hungary)
 Berlin Prize for Young Artists (BPFYA; Berlin, Germany)
 Canadian International Music Competition (Montreal, Canada)
 Classica Nova International Music Competition (Hannover, Germany)
 Euro Elite International Music Competition (Toronto, Canada)
 Felix Mendelssohn Bartholdy Conservatory Competition (Berlin, Germany)
 The 1st International IMMA Records Classical Music Competition
 Gaudeamus Competition (Netherlands)
 Grand Maestro International Music Competition - Online (Canada)
 Grand Metropolitan International Music Competition - Online (Canada)
 International Guitar Competition & Festival (Berlin, Germany)
 International Joseph Joachim Violin Competition Hanover
 International Performers Competition Brno (Brno, Czech Republic)
 International US New Star Strings Competition - Online (USA)
 International Piano Competition for Young Pianists Kronberg (Germany)
 International Radio Competition for Young Musicians Concertino Praga (Prague, Czech Republic)
 Italy Percussion Competition (Montesilvano Pescara)
 Leos Janacek International Competition (Brno, Czech Republic)
 Monte-Carlo Music Masters 
 Montreal International Music Competition (Montreal, Canada)
 Mykola Lysenko International Music Competition (Kyiv, Ukraine)
 Matosinhos International Competition (Online)
 North American Virtuoso International Music Competition (Online)
 Quebec Music Competition (Montreal, Quebec, Canada) Live and Online
 Queen Elisabeth Music Competition (Brussels, Belgium)
 Ronald Sachs International Music Competition – Strings, Woodwinds, Brass, Piano (North Carolina, US)
 Trinity International Music Competition - Online (Toronto, Canada)
 TROMP international music competition & Festival (Eindhoven, Netherlands)
 TONALi Music Competition (Hamburg, Germany)
 SVIRÉL International Music Competition and Festival for Soloists and Chamber Groups (Slovenia)
 Triomphe de l'Art International Music Competition (Brussels, Belgium)
 Furioso Violin Competition (online)
 Youth Zeal Music Competition (Helsinki, Finland) 
 Zodiac International Music Competition (online)

Large Ensembles

 Ictus International Music Competition. (online international competition for bands, orchestras and jazz ensembles)

Musicology
 Annual Musicology Competition (Worldwide)

Piano/keyboard 

INTERNATIONAL MUSIC COMPETITION
 Progressive Musicians Carnegie Hall Laureate Gala
 " International Piano Competition - Mauro Paolo Monopoli Prize " International Piano Competition (Barletta/Apulia, Italy)
 "Città di Barletta - International Young Musician Piano Competition " International Young Musician Piano Competition (Barletta/Apulia, Italy)
 Vienna Youth International Piano Competition (Vienna, Austria)
 Aarhus International Piano Competition (Aarhus, Denmark)
 Ambitus Orgelconcours (The Netherlands)
 American Paderewski Piano Competition (Los Angeles, US)
http://www.americanprotege.com/ps American Protege International Piano and Strings Competition (US)
 Anton Rubinstein Competition (Dresden, Germany)
 Artciál International Piano Competition (San Francisco, US)
 Arthur Rubinstein International Piano Master Competition (Tel Aviv, Israel)
 Astral National Auditions (Philadelphia, US)
 Beethoven National Piano Competition (Chantilly, US)
 BNDES International Piano Competition (Rio de Janeiro, Brazil)
 Bradshaw and Buono International Piano Competition (New York, US)
 César Franck International Piano Competition (Brussels, Belgium)
 Ciutat de Carlet International Piano Competition (Valencia, Spain)
 Clara Haskil International Piano Competition (Vevey, Switzerland)
 Cleveland International Piano Competition (Cleveland, US)
 Concours Géza Anda (Zurich, Switzerland)
 Dallas Chamber Symphony International Piano Competition (Dallas, US)
 The Dranoff International Two Piano Foundation (Dallas, US)
 Dublin International Piano Competition (Dublin, Ireland)
 Epinal International Piano Competition (Epinal, France)
 EPTA - International Piano Competition Svetislav Stančić (Zagreb, Croatia)
 Eugen d'Albert International Music Competition (Giubiasco, Switzerland)
 Euro Elite International Music Competition (Toronto, Canada)
 Ferruccio Busoni International Piano Competition (Bolzano, Italy)
 Malta International Piano Competition, Valletta/Mdina, Malta
 Festival for Creative Pianists (US)
 George Enescu International Competition (Piano section) (Bucharest, Romania)
 Gina Bachauer International Piano Competition (Salt Lake City, US)
 Grand Maestro International Music Competition - Online (Canada)
 Grand Metropolitan International Music Competition - Online (Canada)
 Hamamatsu International Piano Competition (Hamamatsu, JP)
 Hilton Head International Piano Competition (Hilton Head Island, South Carolina, US)
 Globe International Piano Competition (Hilversum, Netherlands)
 Honens International Piano Competition (Calgary, Canada)
 International Carl Bechstein Piano Competition (various, Europe)
 International Piano Competition for Young Pianists Kronberg (Germany)
 International Piano Competition "Johann Sebastian Bach" (Würzburg, Germany)
 International Beethoven Piano Competition Vienna (Internationaler Beethoven Klavierwettbewerb Wien; Vienna, Austria)
 International Chopin Piano Competition (Poland)
 International Cochran Piano Competition (Poland/Australia)
 International Edvard Grieg Piano Competition (Bergen, Norway)
 International Ettore Pozzoli Piano Competition (Seregno, Italy)
 International Franz Liszt Piano Competition (Utrecht, Netherlands)
 International Fryderyk Chopin Piano Competition for Children and Youth (Szafarnia, Poland)
 International Geelvinck Fortepiano Concours (Amsterdam, The Netherlands)
 International Goedicke Organ Competition (Moscow, Russia)
 International Johann Sebastian Bach Competition (organ; Leipzig, Germany)
 International Mozart Piano Competition (Frascati (Rome), Italy)
 International Mozart Piano Competition (Salzburg, Austria)
 International Piano Competition for Outstanding Amateurs (Paris, France)
 International Radio Competition for Young Musicians Concertino Praga (Prague, Czech Republic)
 International New Star Piano Competition-Online (USA)
 International Tchaikovsky Competition (Russia)
 International Telekom Beethoven Competition (Bonn, Germany)
 ISANGYUN Competition (Tongyeong, South Korea)
 JMIPC – James Mottram International Piano Competition at the Royal Northern College of Music (Manchester, England)
 José Iturbi International Piano Competition (Los Angeles, US)
 Karlovac International Piano Competition (Karlovac, Croatia)
 Kerikeri National Piano Competition (Kerikeri, New Zealand)
 Kissingen Piano Olympics (Kissinger Klavierolymp, Bad Kissingen, Germany)
 Lagny-sur-Marne International Piano Competition (Lagny, France)
 Leeds International Pianoforte Competition (Leeds, UK)
 Les Etoiles du Piano (Roubaix, France)
 Maria Canals International Music Competition (Barcelona, Spain)
 Monte-Carlo Music Masters 
 Mykola Lysenko International Music Competition (Kyiv, Ukraine)
 North American Virtuoso International Music Competition (Online)
 ON STAGE International Classical Music Competition (Online Competition)
 Paloma O'Shea International Piano Competition (Santander, Spain)
 Panama International Piano Competition (Panama City, Panama)
 Peabody Mason International Piano Competition (Boston, US)
 Petr Eben International Organ Competition (Opava, Czech Republic)
 Pilar Bayona Piano Competition (Spain)
 Quebec Music Competition (Montreal, Quebec, Canada) Live and Online
 Queen Elisabeth Music Competition (Belgium)
 Ricard Viñes International Piano Competition (Lleida, Spain)
 Ronald Sachs International Music Competition
 Rubato International Piano Competition (Oxford, Alabama, USA)
 The Gurwitz International Piano Competition, (San Antonio, Texas, US)
 San Diego International Piano Competition and Festival for Outstanding Amateurs (San Diego, California, US)
 Scottish International Piano Competition (Glasgow, UK)
 Seattle Symphony Piano Competition (Seattle, Washington, US)
 Sendai International Music Competition (Sendai, Japan)
 The Shean Piano Competition (Edmonton, Alberta, Canada)
 St Albans International Organ Competition (St Albans, UK)
 Sussex International Piano Competition (Worthing, UK)
 Sydney International Piano Competition (Sydney, Australia)
 Thailand International Chopin Piano Competition (Bangkok, Thailand)
 Trinity International Music Competition - Online (Toronto, Canada)
 Triomphe de l'Art International Music Competition (Brussels, Belgium)
 US New Star Piano Competition (San Jose, US)
US New Star Etude Competition( Up to age 19) - Online (USA)
US New Star Competition by Composer(Up to age 19) - Online (USA)
US New Star Two Pianist (Duet and Duo) Competition(Up to age19) - Online (USA)
 Valencia International Piano Competition Prize Iturbi (Valencia, Spain)
 Van Cliburn International Piano Competition (Fort Worth, US)
 Vancouver International Music Competition (Vancouver, Canada)
 Vienna New Year’s Concert International Piano Competition
 Vigo International Piano Competition (Vigo, Spain)
 World International Piano Competition (Santa Fe, US)
 Youth Zeal Music Competition (Helsinki, Finland) 
 Young Pianist of the North International competition (Newcastle upon Tyne, UK)

String instruments 

 Progressive Musicians Carnegie Hall Laureate Gala
 "Città di Barletta - International Young Musician String Competition " International Young Musician String Competition (Barletta/Apulia, Italy)
 American Protege International Piano and Strings Competition (US)
 Animato International Violin Competition (Brisbane, Australia)
 Antonio Janigro International Cello Competition (Croatia)
Appassionato International Youth Music Festival (Quebec, Canada) 
 Bach-Abel Viola da Gamba Competition (Köthen, Germany; 1997–)
 Carl Flesch International Violin Competition (London, UK; 1945–1992)
 Carl Nielsen International Music Competition (Odense, Denmark)
 Città di Brescia International Violin Competition (Brescia, Italy)
 Furioso violin Competition (online)
 George Enescu International Competition (Violin, Cello section) (Bucharest, Romania)
 Henryk Wieniawski Violin Competition (Poznań, Poland)
 International Arthur Grumiaux Competition for Young Violinists (Brussels, Belgium)
 International Brahms Competition (Pörtschach am Wörthersee, Austria)
 International Fritz Kreisler Competition (Vienna, Austria)
 International Jean Sibelius Violin Competition (Helsinki, Finland)
 International Violin Competition Leopold Mozart in Augsburg (Augsburg, Germany)
 International Radio Competition for Young Musicians Concertino Praga (Prague, Czech Republic)
 International Tchaikovsky Competition (Moscow, Russia)
 International Violin Competition Henri Marteau (Lichtenberg and Hof, Germany)
 International Violin Competition of Indianapolis (Indianapolis, US)
 ISANGYUN Competition (Tongyeong, South Korea)
 Klaipeda International Cello Competition (Klaipeda, Lithuania)
 Klein Competition (San Francisco, US)
 Lionel Tertis International Viola Competition (Isle of Man, UK)
 Maurice Vieux International Viola Competition (France)
 Michael Hill International Violin Competition (New Zealand)
 Moscow International David Oistrakh Violin Competition (Moscow, Russia)
 Mykola Lysenko International Music Competition (Kyiv, Ukraine)
 Paganini International Competition (Genoa, Italy)
 Primrose International Viola Competition (Albuquerque, New Mexico)
 Quebec Music Competition (Montreal, Quebec, Canada) Live and Online
 Queen Elisabeth Music Competition (Belgium)
 Ronald Sachs International Music Competition
 Mstislav Rostropovich International Cello Competition (Paris, France)
 Sendai International Music Competition (Sendai, Japan)
 Schoenfeld International String Competition (Harbin, China)
 The Shean Strings Competition (Edmonton, Alberta, Canada)
Shanghai Isaac Stern International Violin Competition (Shanghai, China)
 Singapore International Violin Competition (Singapore)
 STREICHWERK International String Competition (Berlin, Germany)
 Stulberg International String Competition (US)
 Washington International Competition for Strings (Washington, D.C., US)
 Monte-Carlo Music Masters 
 National Chamber Ensemble Outstanding Young Artist Achievement Award Competition (Arlington, VA, US)
 Windsor Festival International String Competition (Windsor, UK)
 Triomphe de l'Art International Music Competition (Brussels, Belgium)
 Vancouver International Music Competition (Vancouver, Canada)
 Yehudi Menuhin International Competition for Young Violinists (Richmond, VA, US in 2021)
 Youth Zeal Music Competition (Helsinki, Finland) 
 Young Talents with Orchestra, competition for violin and piano with orchestra (Milan, Italy)

Woodwind instruments 

 Progressive Musicians Carnegie Hall Laureate Gala
 "Città di Barletta - International Young Musician Wind Competition " International Young Musician Wind Competition (Barletta/Apulia, Italy)
 American Protege International Woodwinds and Brass Competition (US)
 American Protege International Music Talent Competition (US)
Appassionato International Youth Music Festival (Quebec, Canada) 
 Australian Youth Classical Music Competition (Geelong, Australia)
 Austral National Auditions (Philadelphia, US)
 BBC Young Musician of the Year (UK)
 Chetham's Flute Competition (Manchester, UK)
 Città di Barletta Young Musician International Competition (Barletta, Italy)
 Concours de Genève Prix international d'interprétation & de composition (Geneva, Switzerland)
 Concours de Musique et des Beaux Arts – Quebec Music Competition|Concours International de Musique et des Beaux Arts (Quebec, Canada)
 Fischoff National Chamber Music Competition (Indiana, US)
 Forte International Music Competition and Festivals
 Gillet-Hugo Fox Competition – Bassoon and Oboe competition (US)
 Malta International Woondwinds Competition, Valletta/Mdina, Malta
 Gregynog Young Musicians Competition (Wales, UK)
 Henri Tomasi International Woodwind Quintet Competition (Marseille, France)
 Hugo Kauder Society-International Music Competition (New Haven, US)
 International Clarinet Celebration Young Artists Competition (Portland, OR)
 International Chamber Music Competition for ensembles 20-30yrs (Wollongong, Australia)
 International Competition for Young Classical Guitarists (Siracusa, Italy)
 International Crescendo Music Awards Competition (Tulsa US)
 International Flute Competition Camerata Strumentale (Timişoara, Romania)
 International Independent Music Competition "Individualis" (Ukraine)
 International Johann Sebastian Bach Competition (Leipzig, Germany)
 International Radio Competition for Young Musicians Concertino Praga (Prague, Czech Republic)
 International Russian Rotary Children Music Competition (Russia)
 International Tchaikovsky Competition for Young Musicians (Moscow, Russia)
 Jeunesses Musicales International (Various)
 Johansen International Competition for Young String Players (Washington DC, US)
 Midwest Young Artists Discover National Chamber Music Competition (Illinois, US)
 National Young Artist Competition (Charleston, US)
 National Arts Centre Orchestra Bursary Competition (Ottawa, Canada)
 New York International Piano Competition (New York, US)
 Olympic Challenge Competition (children; Montclair, US)
 PianoArts North American Piano Competition for High School and College Students (US)
 Prague Spring International Music Competition (Prague, Czech Republic)
 Quebec Music Competition (Montreal, Quebec, Canada)
 RESEO Award (Brussels, Belgium)
 The Respighi Prize Music Competition for Young Composers & Soloists (New York, US)
 Ronald Sachs International Music Competition
 Russian Music Competition (US)
 Saint Paul String Quartet Competition (US)
 Sydney Eisteddfod (Sydney, Australia)
 Tartini Music Competition for violin (Piran, Slovenia)
 Vandoren Emerging Artist Competition – Saxophone and Clarinet (US)
 VSA International Young Soloists Competition (Washington, DC, US)
 Wideman Piano Competition (Shreveport, US)
 William C. Byrd Young Artist Competition (Flint, US)

Young Musicians 
 Progressive Musicians Carnegie Hall Laureate Gala
 Young Musician International Competition 'Città di Barletta' (Barletta - Italy) sections : Strings, Winds, Guitar, Piano, Chamber Music and Composition
 ABC Young Performers Awards (Sydney, Australia)
International Tchaikovsky Competition for Young Musicians (Russia)
International Piano Competition for Young Pianists Kronberg (Germany)
International New Star Piano Competition(Up to 26) - Online (USA)
US New Star Etude Competition( Up to age 19) - Online (USA)
US New Star Strings Competition(Up to age 19) - Online (USA)
US New Star Competition by Composer(Up to age 19) - Online (USA)
US New Star Two Pianist (Duet and Duo) Competition(Up to age19) - Online (USA)

See also 
 European Union of Music Competitions for Youth
 List of Recipients of the Terence Judd Award
 World Federation of International Music Competitions

References

External links
 List of Classical Music Competitions at MusicaNeo
 Directory of International Piano Competitions 
 Musicalchairs.info List of Competitions
 ClassicalNet: Festivals, Competitions, Concerts & Concert Venues
 
 World Federation of International Music Competitions
 List of all flute laureates 
 
Competitions
Classical music